Legislative elections were held in Argentina on 22 October 2017 to elect half of the Chamber of Deputies and one third of the Senate. The result was a victory for the ruling Cambiemos alliance, being the most voted force in 13 of the 24 districts.

Background
The elections took place during the presidency of Mauricio Macri whose Cambiemos coalition also governed the City of Buenos Aires and Buenos Aires Province. As Cambiemos was a new coalition with few noteworthy political figures, several members of the cabinet were asked to resign from their positions and run for Congress in their respective districts instead.

Peronist factions were divided in two main groups; the Citizen's Unity, led by the former president Cristina Kirchner, led the parliamentary opposition to Macri's administration. Another group was composed of politicians from the Justicialist Party and the Renewal Front.

Electoral system

Chamber of Deputies 
The 257 members of the Chamber of Deputies are elected by proportional representation in 24 multi-member constituencies based on the provinces (plus the City of Buenos Aires). Seats are allocated using the d'Hondt method with a 3% electoral threshold. In this election, 127 of the 257 seats are up for renewal for a four-year term.

Senate 

The 72 members of the Senate are elected in the same 24 constituencies, with three seats in each. The party receiving the most votes in each constituency wins two seats, with the third seat awarded to the second-placed party. The 2017 elections will see one-third of Senators renewed, with eight provinces electing three Senators; Buenos Aires, Formosa, Jujuy, La Rioja, Misiones, San Juan, San Luis and Santa Cruz.

Schedule 

The timetable for the different national electoral acts was established on the following dates:

 25 April: Closure of the provisional electoral register.
 5 May: Publication of the provisional electoral register.
 20 May: Deadline to correct the electoral register.
 14 June: Deadline to register the alliances.
 24 June: Deadline to register the pre-nominations for the primary elections (PASO).
 14 July: Beginning of the electoral campaign for the PASO and publication of the definitive electoral register.
 21 July: Beginning of the prohibition of the broadcast of advertisements to capture the vote.
 29 July: Beginning of the prohibition of public acts (inaugurations, announcements) by the government until the PASO.
 11 August: Beginning of the election silence.
 13 August: Primary elections (PASO).
 17 September: Start of the election campaign for the national elections.
 27 September: Beginning of the prohibition to broadcast advertising to capture the vote.
 7 October: Beginning of the prohibition of public acts (inaugurations, announcements) by the government, until the elections.
 14 October: Beginning of the prohibition to publish opinion polls.
 20 October: Beginning of the election silence.
 22 October: National legislative elections.

Results

Chamber of Deputies

Results by province

Senate

Results by province

References

Argentina
2017
October 2017 events in South America
Presidency of Mauricio Macri